BzODZ-EPyr is an indole based synthetic cannabinoid that has been sold as a designer drug in Russia.

It acts as a CB1 receptor agonist with a pKB value of 7.2 and demonstrates that replacing the ketone in 3-carbonylindoles with an oxadiazole spacer does generally not lead to activity loss.

See also 

 5F-SDB-006
 AB-PICA
 ADBICA
 APICA
 CUMYL-PICA
 PTI-1
 PTI-2
 SDB-006

References 

Cannabinoids
Designer drugs
Indoles
Oxadiazoles
Pyrrolidines